Ralph Redruth DD  (also Redruffe or Ruderhith) was an English medieval college Fellow and university Chancellor.

Redruth was a Cornish Fellow of Exeter College, Oxford and one of two Senior Fellows of Oriel College, Oxford. He was Chancellor of the University of Oxford during 1392–93.

See also
 Redruth, a town in Cornwall

References

Year of birth unknown
Year of death unknown
Medieval Cornish people
Fellows of Exeter College, Oxford
Fellows of Oriel College, Oxford
Chancellors of the University of Oxford
14th-century English people
14th-century Roman Catholics